The Decoration of Honor Meritorious for Polish Culture or Meritorious for Polish Culture, is a Polish departmental decoration in Arts awarded by the Ministry of Culture and National Heritage of the Republic of Poland to persons and organizations for distinguished contributions to the Polish culture and heritage. This award was instituted on 11 August 1969.

See also 
Gloria Artis
 Orders, decorations, and medals of Poland

References 

Civil awards and decorations of Poland
Awards established in 1969
Departmental decorations of Poland